Blockberry Creative (Hangul: 블록베리크리에이티브) is a South Korean record label formed in 2016. It is a subsidiary of Polaris Entertainment. The label is home to the girl group Loona and soloist Sunye.

History 
Blockberry Creative was officially established on March 22, 2016, as a subsidiary label of Polaris Entertainment.

On October 2, 2016,  Blockberry Creative launched their first girl group project, Loona (lit Girl of the Month), which was expected to run for 18 months. The project would individually introduce each member of the new group by releasing a solo single, and by March 2018 all members had been introduced.

In the first half of 2018, Go Yu-jin represented Blockberry Creative in the reality survival show Produce 48. She was eliminated in the second round of eliminations, finishing in 31st place. Go Yu-jin has now terminated her trainee contract and left Blockberry Creative.

In the second half of 2021, Choi Yeyoung, Joung Min and Ryu Sion represented Blockberry Creative in the reality survival show Girls Planet 999. Joung Min along with Ryu Sion got eliminated in the first round of eliminations. Choi Yeyoung was eliminated in the second round of eliminations.

In February 2022, Sunye signed a contract with Blockberry Creative. On March 16, 2022, Blockberry announced their first boy group project, Boy of the Month.

Artists
Soloists
 Sunye

Groups
 Loona

Sub-units
 Loona 1/3
 Loona Odd Eye Circle
 Loona yyxy

Former artists
 Loona
 Chuu (2017–2022)
 Kim Lip (2017–2023) 
 JinSoul (2017–2023)
 Choerry (2017–2023)
 HeeJin (2016–2023)

References 

South Korean record labels